Robert Pratt may refer to:
 Robert Pratt (American football) (born 1951), former American football guard
 Robert John Pratt (1907–2003), Canadian architect
 Robert W. Pratt (born 1947), U.S. federal judge 
 Robert Pratt (settler) (1870–1935), Canadian settler
 Robert Pratt (mayor) (1845–1908), educator and mayor of Minneapolis, Minnesota

See also
 Bob Pratt (1912–2001), Australian rules footballer
 Bob Pratt Jr. (born 1936), Australian rules footballer
 Bob Pratt (inventor), American inventor and former engineer